Trichambaram inscription is an 11th century inscription from Trichambaram, near Taliparamba in north Kerala. The old Malayalam inscription in Vattezhuthu script (with some Grantha characters) is engraved on two blocks of granite (with writing on one side) in the base of the central shrine of the Trichambaram Temple.

 The inscription records an endowment of the Manavepala Manaviyadan, the chieftain of Eranadu, for thiruvilakku at "Trichemmaram Temple".  
 It also mentions a person named Kapali Narayanan Bhattavijayan, some plot, and the arrangements for weekly supply of oil for the thiruvilakku. 
 Manavepala Manaviyadan was the hereditary title of the chieftains of Eranadu in central Kerala.

See also 

 Jewish copper plates of Cochin

References 

11th-century inscriptions
Vatteluttu
Malayalam inscriptions
Kerala history inscriptions